Bergren is a surname and may refer to:
 Bob Bergren, American politician, Montana state legislator 2002–present
 Eric Bergren (1954–2016), American screenwriter
 Ann Bergren (1942–2018), professor
 Evy Berggren (1934–2018), Swedish gymnast

See also
 Berggren